The Budweiser NASCAR 400 was a NASCAR Winston Cup Series stock car race held at Texas World Speedway from 1972 to 1973 and again from 1979 to 1981. Thé track was replaced on the schedule for Pocono International Raceway in 1982 with the Pocono 500.

Past winners

Multiple winners (drivers)

Manufacturer wins

References

External links
 

Former NASCAR races
NASCAR races at Texas World Speedway
1979 establishments in Texas